The 1929 German football championship, the 22nd edition of the competition, was won by SpVgg Fürth, defeating Hertha BSC 3–2 in the final.

For SpVgg Fürth it was the third national championship after wins in 1914 and 1926 but the club would never again appear in the final after 1929. It was the last highlight of the decade after the First World War that saw seven of the ten national championships go to Middle Franconian clubs 1. FC Nürnberg and SpVgg Fürth. For Hertha BSC it marked the fourth consecutive final loss, the only club to do so. Hertha had previously lost the 1926 final to Fürth as well but would go on to win back-to-back championships in 1930 and 1931.

Hertha's Hanne Sobek was the top scorer of the 1929 championship with six goals.

Sixteen club qualified for the knock-out competition, two from each of the regional federations plus an additional third club from the South and West. In all cases the regional champions qualified and almost all of the runners-up, except in Central Germany where the second spot went to the regional cup winner. In the West the third spot went to the third placed team of the championship while, in the South, the third spot was determined in a separate qualifying competition for runners-up and third placed teams.

Qualified teams
The teams qualified through the regional championships:

Competition

Round of 16
The round of 16, played on 9 and 16 June 1929:

|}

Quarter-finals
The quarter-finals, played on 30 June 1929:

|}

Semi-finals
The semi-finals, played on 7 July 1929, with the replay played on 21 July:

|}

Replay

|}

Final

References

Sources
 kicker Allmanach 1990, by kicker, page 160 to 178 - German championship

External links
 German Championship 1928–29 at weltfussball.de 
 German Championship 1929 at RSSSF

1
German
German football championship seasons